Several tornadoes have been known as the Birmingham tornado.

Birmingham, Alabama, United States
 1956 McDonald Chapel tornado, an F4 tornado which struck Jefferson County, Alabama, killing 25 and injuring 200
 Tornado outbreak of April 1977, an F5 tornado which struck the northern suburbs of Jefferson County, Alabama, killing 22 and injuring 125
 Tornado outbreak of April 6–9, 1998, produced an F5 tornado which affected the western and northern suburbs of Birmingham killing 32
 2011 Tuscaloosa–Birmingham tornado, an EF4 tornado which caused major damage in Tuscaloosa and large portions of the northern and western suburbs of Birmingham, killing 64 people

Birmingham, England, United Kingdom
 2005 Birmingham tornado, the costliest in United Kingdom history, which caused significant damage in the city of Birmingham

Tornadoes in Alabama
Tornadoes in the United Kingdom